Finland competed at the 2017 World Aquatics Championships in Budapest, Hungary from 14 July to 30 July.

Diving

Finland entered 3 divers (two male and one female).

Swimming

Finnish swimmers have achieved qualifying standards in the following events (up to a maximum of 2 swimmers in each event at the A-standard entry time, and 1 at the B-standard):

Men

Women

References

Nations at the 2017 World Aquatics Championships
Finland at the World Aquatics Championships
2017 in Finnish sport